Abam is a populated clan in Abia state. It is located in Arochukwu/Ohafia federal constituency of Nigeria.

Abam is a brother clan to Ohafia. The progenitor of the people of Abam is known as Onyerubi Atita. As a people, Abam clan in Abia state is sometimes referred to as Abam Onyerubi.

Abam in Abia state is made up of 26 villages. Some of the villages are: Ndiebe Abam, Ozu Abam, Idima Abam, Amaeke Abam, Ndi Oji Abam, Amelu Abam, Amuru Abam, Amaogbu Abam, Atan Abam, Ndi Okereke Abam, Ndi Ojugwo Abam, Ndi Inya Abam, Ndi Mmeme Abam, Ndi Agwu Abam and others.

There are other communities and towns in other parts of Eastern Nigeria, that trace their ancestry to Abam. 
Some of them are: Umuhu in Abia state, Ndoro in Abia state, Abba in Imo state, Abam Ubakala in Abia state, Abam Azia in Anambra state and others.

References

Ethnic groups in Nigeria